The 1975 Pau Grand Prix was a Formula Two motor race held on 19 May 1975 at the Pau circuit, in Pau, Pyrénées-Atlantiques, France. The Grand Prix was won by Jacques Laffite, driving the Martini. Jean-Pierre Jabouille finished second and Patrick Depailler third.

Classification

Race

References

Pau Grand Prix
1975 in French motorsport